Tatyana Alexeyevna Afanasyeva (Kiev, 19 November 1876 – Leiden, 14 April 1964) (also known as Tatiana Ehrenfest-Afanaseva or spelled Afanassjewa) was a Russian/Dutch mathematician and physicist who made contributions to the fields of statistical mechanics and statistical thermodynamics.  On 21 December 1904, she married Austrian physicist Paul Ehrenfest (1880–1933). They had two daughters and two sons; one daughter, Tatyana Pavlovna Ehrenfest, also became a mathematician.

Early life 
Afanasyeva was born in Kiev, Ukraine, then part of the Russian Empire.  Her father was Alexander Afanassjev, a chief engineer on the Imperial Railways, who would bring Tatyana on his travels around the Russian Empire.  Her father died while she was still young, so she moved to St Petersburg in Russia to live with her aunt Sonya, and uncle Peter Afanassjev, a professor at the St Petersburg Polytechnic Institute.

Tatyana attended normal school in St Petersburg with a specialty in mathematics and science.  At the time, women were not allowed to attend universities in Russian territory, so after graduating from normal school, Tatyana began studying mathematics and physics at the Women's University in St Petersburg under Orest Chvolson.  In 1902, she transferred to University of Göttingen in Germany to continue her studies with Felix Klein and David Hilbert.

At the University of Göttingen, Tatyana met Paul Ehrenfest.  When Ehrenfest discovered that Tatyana could not attend a mathematics club meeting, he argued with the school to have the rule changed.  A friendship developed between the two, and they married in 1904, later returned to St Petersburg in 1907.  Under Russian law, marriage was not allowed between two people of different religions. Since Tatyana was a Russian Orthodox and Ehrenfest was Jewish, they both decided to officially renounce their religions in order to remain married.

In 1912 they moved to Leiden in the Netherlands, where Paul Ehrenfest was appointed to succeed H.A. Lorentz as professor at the University of Leiden, and where the couple lived throughout their career.

Works in mathematics and physics
Initially, Tatyana collaborated closely with her husband, most famously on their classic 1911 review of the statistical mechanics of Boltzmann. The Conceptual Foundations of the Statistical Approach in Mechanics, by Paul and Tatyana Ehrenfest was originally published in 1911 as an article for the German Encyklopädie der mathematischen Wissenschaften (Encyclopedia of Mathematical Sciences), and has since been translated and republished.

She published many papers on various topics such as randomness and entropy, and teaching geometry to children.

Contact with Einstein
Albert Einstein was a frequent guest in the 1920s at her home Witte Rozenstraat 57 in Leiden, witness the many signatures on the wall. Later Einstein departed for Princeton University and Afanasyeva corresponded. The archives of Museum Boerhaave in Leiden has three letters to her from Einstein.

Afanasjeva contacted Einstein for his advice on her manuscript on thermodynamics and inquired about a translator. She wanted to give thermodynamics a rigorous mathematical foundation which was lacking and describe pressure, temperature and entropy in changing systems. Einstein responded on 12 August 1947 that he applauded her approach but he also had some criticisms:

"Ich habe den Eindruck gewonnen, dass Sie ein bisschen von logischen Putzteufel besessen sind, und dass daran die Übersichtlichkeit des Buches leide."
(Translation: I have got the impression, that you are possessed somewhat by a logical polishing devil, and that the clarity of the book suffers.)

Einstein did not suggest a translator and sent the manuscript back to Afanasjeva who paid herself for its publication in 1956 as Die Grundlagen der Thermodynamik with Brill Publishers in Leiden with some, but not all of Einstein's corrections.

Legacy

The Dutch Physics Council sponsors the Ehrenfest-Afanassjewa thesis award.

Notes
  . See p. 57: "In 1912 Ehrenfest succeeded Hendrik Antoon Lorentz (1853–1928) as professor of theoretical physics at Leiden. ... In Leiden, the Ehrenfests moved into a Russian-style villa designed by Ehrenfest’s Russian wife Tatiana Afanashewa, a mathematician."
  P. Ehrenfest & T. Ehrenfest (1911) Begriffliche Grundlagen der statistischen Auffassung in der Mechanik, in: Enzyklopädie der mathematischen Wissenschaften mit Einschluß ihrer Anwendungen. Band IV, 2. Teil ( F. Klein and C. Müller (eds.). Leipzig: Teubner, pp. 3–90. Translated as The conceptual Foundations of the Statistical Approach in Mechanics. New York: Cornell University Press, 1959. 
  T. Ehrenfest-Afanassjewa, Die Grundlagen der Thermodynamik (Leiden 1956)
  T. Ehrenfest-Afanassjewa, On the Use of the Notion "Probability" in Physics Am. J. Phys. 26: 388 (1958)
  Tatjana Ehrenfest-Afanassjewa,  .
  Ed de Moor Van Vormleer naar Realistische Meetkunde, Thesis, Utrecht (1999).

References

Further reading

External links 
 Tatiana Ehrenfest-Afanaseva CWP UCLA biography
 Paul and Tatiana Ehrenfest: The Conceptual Foundations of the Statistical Approach in Mechanics, translation Michael J. Moravesik, Dover publications New York 1990 (reprint of the edition of 1959), with a preface by T. Ehrenfest-Afanassjewa.

1876 births
1964 deaths
Scientists from Saint Petersburg
People from Kievsky Uyezd
20th-century Russian mathematicians
Mathematicians from the Russian Empire
Probability theorists
White Russian emigrants to Germany
White Russian emigrants to the Netherlands
Emigrants from the Russian Empire to the Netherlands
Woman scientists from the Russian Empire
20th-century women scientists
20th-century Russian scientists
20th-century women mathematicians
20th-century Russian women